George Ratcliffe (born George Ratcliff 1 April 1856 — 7 March 1928) was an English cricketer who played for Derbyshire from 1887 to 1889.

Ratcliffe was born in Ilkeston, Derbyshire, the son of George Ratcliff, a coal miner, and his wife Priscilla. He became a butcher.

Ratcliffe made his debut for Derbyshire in the 1887 season in a match in June against Surrey. In this he scored 64, but his average fell from this point in his remaining four first-class matches. At the end of the season Derbyshire left the championship but Ratcliffe continued to play for the club in the 1888 and 1889 season. Ratcliffe was a left-handed middle-upper order batsman and played in 10 innings in 5 first-class matches. He bowled two overs but did not take a wicket.

Ratcliffe died in Nottingham at the age of 71.

References

1856 births
1928 deaths
English cricketers
Derbyshire cricketers
People from Ilkeston
Cricketers from Derbyshire